Wu Guanzheng (born August 11, 1938), also spelled as Wu Kuan-cheng is a former Chinese politician and one of the major leaders of the Chinese Communist Party during the administration of Hu Jintao. He served on the Politburo Standing Committee, the country's top ruling body, from 2002 to 2007. During that time he also served as the Secretary of the Central Commission for Discipline Inspection of the Chinese Communist Party, the party's anti-graft body. He had a lengthy political career, having served as mayor of Wuhan, Governor then Party Secretary of Jiangxi, then party chief of Shandong. Wu retired in 2007 and left public life.

Career
Wu was born in Yugan County, Jiangxi province. He joined the Chinese Communist Party in March 1963. Wu graduated from the department of thermal engineering at Beijing's Tsinghua University in 1968, where he studied thermal measurement and automated controls. He was then sent to Wuhan during the Cultural Revolution to work as a shop floor technician at the Gedian Chemical Engineering factory, where he was promoted to supervisor a few years later.

Wu served as the mayor of Wuhan from 1983 to 1986. He became the governor of his native province Jiangxi in 1986 after the removal of Ni Xiance by the provincial People's Congress. He was later promoted to Jiangxi party chief and served between 1995 and 1997. He moved to Shandong in 1997 to become the party chief of the province and was made a full member of the Politburo the same year. It was said that Zeng Qinghong, a major confidant of then party General Secretary and President Jiang Zemin, was fond of Wu's work, and recommended him for further elevation, resulting in his promotion to the Politburo in 1997.

Thereafter, Wu was known to have cultivated good relationships with both Jiang Zemin and his putative successor Hu Jintao. Wu and Hu graduated in the same year, both of them alumni of Tsinghua University. Some sources considered him to be Hu's ally, while other consider him to be Jiang's. As a result, he was sometimes included in the list of people in the Shanghai clique.  In 2002, Wu joined the Politburo Standing Committee as the head of the Central Commission for Discipline Inspection, the party's anti-graft agency. Wu was seen as an easy compromise candidate since he had "cross-factional appeal".

Wu Guanzheng retired from Standing Committee and Central Commission for Discipline Inspection after the 17th Party Congress in October 2007.

See also
Politics of the People's Republic of China

External links
Wu Guanzheng biography @ China Vitae, online database of China VIPs
 Biography of Wu Guanzheng, People's Daily Online

References

1938 births
Living people
Governors of Jiangxi
Chinese Communist Party politicians from Jiangxi
Mayors of Wuhan
Tsinghua University alumni
People's Republic of China politicians from Jiangxi
Politicians from Shangrao
Political office-holders in Shandong
Secretaries of the Central Commission for Discipline Inspection
Members of the 16th Politburo Standing Committee of the Chinese Communist Party
Members of the 15th Politburo of the Chinese Communist Party